Martinsville High School is the name of at least two high schools in the United States of America:

Martinsville High School (Illinois)
Martinsville High School (Indiana)
Martinsville High School (Virginia)